The Biri Larosa Protected Landscape and Seascape is a protected area located in Northern Samar, Philippines, about  west of Catarman. It protects the Balicuatro Islands, composed of the island municipality of Biri and associated smaller islands, off the northwestern coast of Samar in the San Bernardino Strait. It also includes the coastal areas of the adjacent municipalities from which it derives the second half of its name – a combination of the first two letters of Lavezares, Rosario and San Jose.

The protected area spanned  of land and sea when it was gazetted in 2000. It is famous for its natural rock formations, as well as beaches, coral reefs, seagrass beds and mangrove forests. The San Bernardino Strait, noted for its strong waves and currents, is also a popular surfing location in Samar.

Description

It is divided into two subgroups by the Biri Channel, with the main island of Biri on the west composed of 7 islands, and the group of Cabauan Grande (Cabaongon) on the east. The islands border the San Bernardino Strait and Philippine Sea and are separated from Samar by the Bani Channel.

It is generally high with a  rocky perpendicular bluff on its northwestern side. Its coastline is covered with mangroves and has gravel beaches on its western side. It is surrounded by Macarite, Cagnipa, Talisay, Magesang and other smaller unnamed islands and is protected by fringing reefs. In 2000, the island municipality had a population of 8,700 distributed in 8 barangays.

The island's main attraction is its seven gigantic rock formations, namely Magasang, Magsapad, Macadlaw, Puhunan, Bel-at, Caranas and Pinanahawan. These rock formations are a result of underwater tectonic plate movements and crashing waves over millions of years. Another unique feature of the island are the natural saltwater pools at Bel-at and Caranas where visitors can enjoy swimming in clear water. To the south of Biri Channel along the coast of Lavezares are San Juan, Bani and Maravilla islands where several other white sand beaches can be found. On the coast of San Jose and Rosario are the islands of Cabaongon, Gilbert and the rest of the subgroup.

Biodiversity
Coral reefs comprise  of the Biri Larosa protected area which supports 23 different reef fish species such as the siganid. It also contains  of mangrove forests with 15 different mangrove species with Rhizophoraceae being dominant. They provide habitat to different local and migratory bird species such as the bridled tern, black-naped tern, greater crested tern and frigatebird, as well as several species of shellfish. Seagrasses cover about  consisting of five species,  including Cymodocea rotundata, Thalassia hemprichii, and Enhalus acoroides.

The protected area faces threats from coral quarrying, blast fishing, and illegal cutting of mangroves.

Mythology
Biri is a sacred place for the Waray people since ancient times. They believe that Biri is the home of the goddess, Berbinota, who was initially a beautiful mortal woman who ruled the area's vicinity. Stories say that enchanted beings kidnapped the mortal Berbinota in an attempt to make her their ruler, which eventually led to her enthronement as a goddess.

References

Protected landscapes and seascapes of the Philippines
Geography of Northern Samar
Tourist attractions in Northern Samar
Protected areas established in 2000
2000 establishments in the Philippines